Hafsah Faizal is an American author of young adult novels, best known for her New York Times best-selling fantasy novel We Hunt the Flame.

Personal life 
Faizal was born in Florida and grew up in California. She is an American Muslim of Sri Lankan and Arab descent. Her parents are both Muslim Sri Lankan immigrants. Faizal is the oldest of four children and has two sisters, Asma and Azraa.

Faizal was homeschooled starting at age thirteen. At the same age, she first started building her design skills, which led her founding her own web design company, IceyDesigns, at age seventeen.

Faizal names fellow young adult novelists Leigh Bardugo, Roshani Chokshi, and Renée Ahdieh as some of her major literary influences and describes Graceling by Kristin Cashore as the book that made her return to reading.

She lives in Texas.

Career 
Faizal wrote her first novel at age seventeen. Aside from writing, she also has been running a book blog called IceyBooks since September 2010. Faizal says that her background in design influences her writing to the degree that she considers to be a very visual writer.

Faizal self-published her first book under the pen name Hafsah Laziaf in October 2013. It was a young adult science fiction novel called Unbreathable, set in a distant future where Earth was destroyed and humanity settled on a new planet devastated by food shortages and oxygen scarcity.

Faizal wrote four other manuscripts before starting the first draft of We Hunt the Flame, which would be her first traditionally published novel. She found her literary agent through the Twitter book pitch contest #DVPit, finishing up the first draft of what would ultimately become We Hunt the Flame just before the contest started.

We Hunt the Flame was published by Farrar, Straus & Giroux in May 2019, the first of the Sands of Arawiya duology. It debuted on the New York Times bestseller list at #5 and receiving favorable reviews. Inspired by ancient Arabia, the novel tells the story of a hunter who disguises herself as a man in order to travel into a dangerous forest and restore magic to her people. Faizal set the story in a world reminiscent of ancient Arabia, avoiding ties to South Asian cultures that she states are often wrongfully entwined with stories about the Middle East. 

The second Sands of Arawiya book, We Free the Stars, was released on January 19, 2021.

In February 2021, it was reported that STXtv was developing a television adaptation of We Hunt the Flame with Faizal as executive producer.

Her new book, A Tempest of Tea releases Fall 2022 from FSG, Macmillan.

References 

Living people
Women writers of young adult literature
21st-century American women writers
21st-century Muslims
1993 births
American people of Sri Lankan descent
American writers of Arab descent
American young adult novelists
American fantasy writers
Women science fiction and fantasy writers
Novelists from Florida
Novelists from Texas
American Muslims